The Welsh Connection (stylized on the cover as Welsh-Connection) is the eleventh album by the Welsh rock band Man and was released  on the MCA Records label 1976.  It was their first MCA release, and the first after a change of line-up that saw John McKenzie take over on bass from Martin Ace, and Phil Ryan  rejoin. Ryan had worked with Pete Brown in the interim, and arranged for Brown to play on two tracks.

The track "Something is Happening" was sampled on "Break the Bank" a 2014 single by rapper Schoolboy Q.

Track listing

Personnel 
 Micky Jones – vocals, guitar
 Deke Leonard – vocals, guitar
 Phil Ryan – vocals, keyboards
 John McKenzie – vocals, bass
 Terry Williams – vocals, drums

Credits 
 Doug Bennett – engineer
 Nigel Brooke-Heart – tape operation and vocal on "Car Toon"
 Caromay Dixon – vocal on "Something is Happening"
 Jeffrey Hooper – vocal on "Out of Your Head"
 Anton Matthews – vocal on "Out of Your Head"
 Pete Brown – African talking drums on "The Welsh Connection" and "Something is Happening"
 Andrew Lauder – mixing
 Joe Petagno – cover design

References

External links 
 Man - The Welsh Connection (1976) album review by Paul Collins, credits & releases at AllMusic.com
 Man - The Welsh Connection (1976) album releases & credits at Discogs.com
 Man - The Welsh Connection (1976) album credits & user reviews at ProgArchives.com
 Man - The Welsh Connection (1976) album to be listened as stream at Spotify.com

1976 albums
Man (band) albums
MCA Records albums
Albums with cover art by Joe Petagno
Albums recorded at Olympic Sound Studios